State Route 331 (SR 331) is a  state highway located entirely within the northern part of Clayton County in the U.S. state of Georgia. It is the numbered highway portion of Forest Parkway, which continues both west and east of this highway. It connects areas south of Atlanta's Hartsfield–Jackson Atlanta International Airport with Forest Park and Lake City.

Route description
SR 331 begins at an intersection with SR 85 south of the Hartsfield–Jackson Atlanta International Airport and just west of Forest Park. Immediately, the highway travels to the northeast, to an interchange with Interstate 75 (I-75). Inside this interchange, it curves to the east-northeast and crosses over Mud Creek. Just after that interchange, the highway enters Forest Park at an intersection with Frontage Road. Just over  later, SR 331 intersects US 19/US 41/SR 3 (Old Dixie Road). After a slight curve back to the northeast, it curves to the southeast, passing north of Starr Park. A little over  after intersecting the northern terminus of Bartlett Drive, the highway leaves Forest Park and enters Lake City. Approximately  after entering the city limits of Lake City, it meets its eastern terminus, an intersection with SR 54 (Jonesboro Road).

SR 331 is not part of the National Highway System, a system of routes determined to be the most important for the nation's economy, mobility and defense.

History

The roadway that would eventually be designated as SR 331 was built in the mid-1950s as Thames Avenue, from SR 85 to the intersection with US 19 Bus./US 41 Bus. (now US 19/US 41/SR 3), and Georgia Avenue from there to the central part of Forest Park. In the early 1960s, the segment of Thames Avenue between SR 85 and US 19/US 41 (now I-75) was designated as SR 331. In the middle of the decade, the SR 331 designation was extended eastward to US 19/US 41/SR 3, which were then following their current path. In 1971, SR 331 was extended eastward to SR 54, and the entire roadway was renamed as Forest Parkway.

Major intersections

See also

References

External links

 

331
Transportation in Clayton County, Georgia